The Constitution of Brunei Darussalam was created in 1959. Ultimate authority rests with the Sultan, who is both head of state and head of government. In 2004 the Sultan approved a number of amendments to the constitution, including provision for a partially elected Legislative Council. , elections had not been held.

Brunei's political system is governed by the constitution and the national tradition of the Malay Islamic Monarchy (Melayu Islam Beraja; MIB). The three components of MIB cover Malay culture, Islamic religion, and the political framework under the monarchy. It has a legal system based on English common law, although Islamic law (shariah) supersedes this in some cases. Brunei has a parliament but there are no elections; the last election was held in 1962.

Under Brunei's 1959 constitution, His Majesty Hassanal Bolkiah is the head of state with full executive authority. Since 1962, this authority has included emergency powers, which are renewed every two years. Brunei has technically been under martial law since the Brunei Revolt of 1962. Hassanal Bolkiah also serves as the state's prime minister, finance minister and defence minister.

References

Law of Brunei